Epocrates is a mobile medical reference app, owned by athenahealth, that provides clinical reference information on drugs, diseases, diagnostics and patient management.

History
Founded in 1998 by three Stanford Business School students, early versions of Epocrates ran on Palm devices and desktop computers. By 2006, the user base had reached an estimated 525,000 users worldwide, including 200,000 doctors in the United States. Upon the introduction of the Apple iPhone, Epocrates became the first medical app on Apple's mobile platform.

Early funding partners [AM1] included Bay City Capital, Draper Fisher Jurvetson, Interwest Partners, Sprout Group, and Three Arch Partners.

In 2010, the company grew to more than 250 employees and surpassed 1 million users worldwide, including 40% of the physicians in the United States.

On January 7, 2013, it was announced that athenahealth would acquire Epocrates for about $293 million.

In February 2022, Matt Titus was appointed as COO.

Products
The Epocrates app is designed for physicians and other healthcare professionals for use at the point of care. App users check drug dosing, drug interactions, drug safety details, medical news, disease diagnosis and management guidance, as well as evidence-based clinical practice guidelines.

athenahealth markets free and paid subscription versions of the app, which are available from Google Play or the App Store.

References

External links
 

American medical websites
Health information technology companies
Companies formerly listed on the Nasdaq
Health care companies based in California
American corporate subsidiaries